Inge Fænn (born 1945) is a Norwegian editor, journalist, and author. He is from Markane in the municipality of Stryn. Fænn worked as a journalist for the newspaper Fjordingen and he managed the branch office for the newspaper Sunnmørsposten in Stryn before serving as the editor of Fjordingen from 1996 to 2005.

Fænn was a member of the main committee for the Norwegian Skiing Championship in Stryn in 1996, and he served as the head of the Sogn og Fjordane Skiing Association.

Fænn has coauthored books on the Hotel Alexandra and the soccer player Tore André Flo (Flo United), and in 2005 he published 40 år med buss frå  Vest (40 Years with Buses from Vest). He is also the coauthor of the book Skåla – fjellet og folket (Skåla: The Mountain and the People, 2011). In 2014 he published the book Anders Svor. Bilethoggaren frå Hornindal (Anders Svor. The Sculptor from Hornindal).

Bibliography
 1997: Alexandra: familiehotell sidan 1884 (Alexandra: A Family Hotel since 1884). Loen: Hotel Alexandra.   (coauthored with Charles Harvey)
 1999: Flo United: et norsk eventyr (Flo United: a Norwegian Fairy Tale). Oslo: Aschehoug.  I fulltekst ved nb.no  (coauthored with Odd Myklebust)
 2005: 40 år med buss frå Vest (40 Years with Buses from Vest). Stryn: Vest-busscar AS.
 2011: Skåla: fjellet og folket (Skåla: The Mountain and the People). Førde: Selja.   (coauthored with Stig Roger Eide)
 2014: Anders Svor : bilethoggaren frå Hornindal (Anders Svor. The Sculptor from Hornindal). Førde: Selja.

References

1945 births
Living people
Norwegian non-fiction writers
Norwegian newspaper editors
People from Stryn
Norwegian sports executives and administrators